

Horst Niemack (10 March 1909 – 7 April 1992) was a German general during World War II. He was a recipient of the Knight's Cross of the Iron Cross with Oak Leaves and Swords of Nazi Germany. Niemack later took command of the Panzer Lehr Division on 10 January 1945, succeeding General Fritz Bayerlein. From 1956 Niemack served as chairman of the Association of Knight's Cross Recipients (AKCR).

Awards
 Iron Cross (1939)  2nd Class (17 May 1940) & 1st Class (12 June 1940)
 Knight's Cross of the Iron Cross with Oak Leaves and Swords
 Knight's Cross on 13 July 1941 as Rittmeister and commander of Aufklärungs-Abteilung 5
 Oak Leaves on 10 August 1941 as Rittmeister and commander of Aufklärungs-Abteilung 5
 Swords on 4 June 1944 as Oberst and commander of Panzer-Füsilier-Regiment "Großdeutschland"
 Grand Cross of the Order of Merit of the Federal Republic of Germany (12 June 1969)

References

Citations

Bibliography

 
 

1909 births
1992 deaths
Major generals of the German Army (Wehrmacht)
Bundeswehr generals
Military personnel from Hanover
People from the Province of Hanover
Recipients of the Knight's Cross of the Iron Cross with Oak Leaves and Swords
Commanders Crosses of the Order of Merit of the Federal Republic of Germany
German prisoners of war in World War II held by the United Kingdom
Brigadier generals of the German Army